The 1992 XXVIII FIBA International Christmas Tournament "Trofeo Raimundo Saporta-Memorial Fernando Martín" was the 28th edition of the FIBA International Christmas Tournament. It took place at Palacio de Deportes de la Comunidad de Madrid, Madrid, Spain, on 24, 25 and 26 December 1992 with the participations of Real Madrid Teka (champions of the 1991–92 FIBA European Cup), Estudiantes Argentaria (semifinalists of the 1991–92 Liga ACB), Cibona (champions of the 1991–92 A-1 Liga) and Maccabi Tel Aviv (champions of the 1991–92 Ligat HaAl).

League stage

Day 1, December 24, 1992

|}

Day 2, December 25, 1992

|}

Day 3, December 26, 1992

|}

Final standings

References

1992–93 in European basketball
1992–93 in Croatian basketball
1992–93 in Israeli basketball
1992–93 in Spanish basketball